"En Bancarrota" (English: In Bankruptcy) is a ballad written, performed and produced by Canarian singer-songwriter Braulio. The song was produced by himsef and co-produced by Ricardo "Eddy" Martínez. It was released as the second single from his studio album Lo Bello y lo Prohibido (1986). This song became his first (and to date only) number-one hit at the Billboard Hot Latin Tracks chart and was later covered by Elvis Martínez, Raulin Rosendo and Floria Márquez.

In 1988, "En Bancarrota" was nominated for a Grammy Award for Best Latin Pop Performance, on the 30th Annual Grammy Awards. losing to Un hombre solo by Julio Iglesias.

Chart performance
The song debuted on the Billboard Hot Latin Tracks chart at number 36 on 25 April 1987 and climbed to number-one twelve weeks later. It replace at the top of the chart "Es Mi Mujer" by Mexican performer Emmanuel and was replaced six weeks later by "Lo Mejor de Tu Vida" by Spanish performer Julio Iglesias.

Weekly charts

All-time charts

Credits and personnel
This information adopted from Allmusic.
Richard Eddy Martínez – arranger, director, producer  
Braulio García – producer  
Eric Schilling – engineer, mixing  
Mike Cuzzi – engineer  
Ted Stein – engineer  
Mike Todd – assistant engineer

See also
 List of number-one Billboard Top Latin Songs from the 1980s

References

1987 singles
1986 songs
Braulio García songs
Spanish-language songs
CBS Discos singles
1980s ballads
Pop ballads